Carlo D'Este (1936 – November 22, 2020) was an American military historian and biographer, author of several books, especially on World War II. He was a decorated U.S. Army lieutenant colonel. In 2011, he was awarded the Pritzker Literature Award for Lifetime Achievement in Military Writing.

D'Este died at the age of 84 in Cape Cod, Massachusetts.

Education
D'Este attended New Mexico Military Institute junior college in 1956.
He received his B.A. (magna cum laude) from Norwich University in 1958, an M.A. from the University of Richmond in 1974, and an honorary doctorate of humane letters from Norwich in 1992.
He received his master's from University of Richmond in 1974 and then attended University of London under the G.I. bill.

Career and other work

Military historian and biographer, 1978–present
Member of Department of the Army Historical Advisory Committee
Honorary member, Board of Fellows of Norwich University
President of the Friends of Norwich Library
Elected trustee of Mashpee Public Library, Mashpee, Massachusetts for 21 years
United States Army, tours of duty in Germany and Vietnam, retired as lieutenant colonel, 1978.
Lecturer at School of Advanced Military Studies, United States Army Command and General Staff College
Founded (with W.E.B. Griffin) the William E. Colby Military Writers' Symposium (1996).  That organization presents the Colby Award.
Advised President of the United States Bill Clinton on his visit to Italy, England, and Normandy (1994)

A&E adapted his biography of George S. Patton to television for its Biography (TV series) (and, presumably, its Biography Channel) in 1995.  In 1996, C-SPAN interviewed him about that book on its Booknotes program.

Awards and honors
He was awarded the Andrew J. Goodpaster Prize by the American Veterans Center, 2010.

He delivered the annual Kemper Lecture on Winston Churchill at Westminster, College, Fulton, Missouri, 2010.

In 2011, he received the $100,000 Pritzker Literature Award for Lifetime Achievement in Military Writing. The award includes an honorarium, citation and medallion, sponsored by the Chicago-based Tawani Foundation. As part of the award, he gave an interview at the Pritzker Military Museum & Library on October 21, 2011, reflecting on his writing career in the field of World War II scholarship.

Writings
Decision in Normandy: The Unwritten Story of Montgomery and the Allied Campaign, Dutton (New York, NY), 1983.  
Bitter Victory: The Battle for Sicily, 1943, Dutton (New York, NY), 1988. 
World War II in the Mediterranean, 1942–1945, Algonquin (Chapel Hill, NC), 1990. 
Fatal Decision: Anzio and the Battle for Rome, HarperCollins (New York, NY), 1991. 
Patton: A Genius for War, HarperCollins (New York, NY), 1995. 
Eisenhower: A Soldier's Life, 1890–1945, Henry Holt (New York, NY), 2002. 

(introduction to) "Sicilia 1943. Lo sbarco alleato" by Ezio Costanzo (author), Le Nove Muse Editrice (Catania, Italy), 2003
(introduction to) Battle, the Story of the Bulge, John Toland, Random House (New York, NY), 1959
(contributor to) Few Returned: Twenty-eight Days on the Russian Front, Winter 1942–1943, edited by Eugenio Corti, University of Missouri Press (Columbia, MO), 1997.
  Review of Rising '44. The Battle for Warsaw, by Norman Davies.

Decorations
Hall of Fame, New Mexico Military Institute, 2002
Norwich University, D.H.L., 1992
Board of Fellows Service Medallion, Norwich University, 2008

References

Further reading
American Historical Review, October 1992, Alan F. Wilt, review of Fatal Decision: Anzio and the Battle for Rome, pp. 1304–1305.Book, July–August, 2002, Philip Gerard, "A Gentleman and an Officer: Before Dwight Eisenhower Became a National Hero, He Was a Little-Known Soldier, " p. 26.Booklist, May 1, 2002, Gilbert Taylor, review of Eisenhower: A Soldier's Life, 1890–1945, p. 1489.Choice, December 1990, P. L. De Rosa, review of World War II in the Mediterranean, 1942–1945, p. 683.Kirkus Reviews, May 1, 2002, review of Eisenhower, p. 632.
Fraser, David London Review of Books, Vol 5 No 24, December 22, 1983, "Montgomeries" pp. 7–8 (a review of Decision in Normandy: The Unwritten Story of Montgomery and the Allied Campaign - subscription required for full access)London Review of Books, May 26, 1994, review of Decision in Normandy, p. 3.National Review, August 12, 2002, Victor Davis Hanson, "Soldier of Contrasts, " p. 49.The New York Times, September 8, 1988, review of Bitter Victory: The Battle for Sicily, 1943, p. C21.The New York Times Book Review, January 22, 1984, review of Decision in Normandy, p. 10New York Times Book Review, November 27, 1988, Walter Lord, review of Bitter Victory, p. 18New York Times Book Review, July 21, 1991, review of Fatal DecisionNew York Times Book Review, p. 27; December 10, 1995, Alistair Horne, review of Patton: A Genius for WarNew York Times Book Review, pp. 9, 11; July 28, 2002, Timothy Naftali, "The Hardest Job in the Longest Day, " p. 8.Publishers Weekly, October 14, 1983, review of Decision in Normandy, p. 51Publishers Weekly, July 1, 1988, review of Bitter Victory, pp. 61–62Publishers Weekly, April 12, 1991, review of Fatal Decision, p. 51Publishers Weekly, April 15, 2002, review of Eisenhower, p. 49.Times Literary Supplement, September 16, 1988, Michael Carver, review of Bitter Victory, p. 1022Times Literary Supplement, September 6, 1991, Michael Howard, review of Fatal Decision, pp. 11–12Times Literary Supplement, June 10, 1994, review of Decision in Normandy, p. 33.The Wall Street Journal, December 8, 1995, Mark Yost, review of Patton, p. A10The Wall Street Journal, July 12, 2002, Max Boot, "Less to Like about Ike, " p. W12.*

External links
 Carlo D'Este from HarperCollins Publishers Publisher's biographic sketch
 Patton, Harper Perennial, Carlo D'este, Book - Barnes & Noble Bookseller's biographical sketch
 Carlo D'Este Interview and biography at The Pritzker Military Museum & Library from February 8, 2007

In Depth interview with D'Este, July 6, 2003
 Interview on Warlord: a life of Winston Churchill at War, 1874-1945'' at the Pritzker Military Museum & Library on November 13, 2008 
Webcast Panel on U.S. General Dwight D. Eisenhower with Geoffrey Perret at the Pritzker Military Museum & Library on October 23, 2003

1936 births
Writers from Oakland, California
New Mexico Military Institute alumni
Norwich University alumni
Alumni of the University of London
University of Richmond alumni
American biographers
American male biographers
American military historians
Historians of World War II
United States Army colonels
Recipients of the Legion of Merit
Historians from California
2020 deaths